Pak Tai Temple may refer to

 Sam Tai Tsz Temple and Pak Tai Temple, Wan Chai, Hong Kong
 Wan Chai Pak Tai Temple, Hong Kong
 Yuk Hui Temple, also known as Pak Tai Temple